Michael Lee (born ) is a Canadian politician who has represented the electoral district of Vancouver-Langara in the Legislative Assembly of British Columbia since 2017. A member of the British Columbia Liberal Party caucus, he serves as its Critic for Indigenous Relations and Reconciliation. He ran for the party's leadership in 2018 and 2022.

Background
Born in Vancouver, Lee is the son of immigrants from Hong Kong. His mother and father worked as a nurse and a pharmacist respectively. He attended the University of British Columbia, graduating with a Bachelor of Science in biology in 1986, Bachelor of Arts (Hons) in political science in 1989, and Master of Arts in political science with a focus on environmental regulations in 1992. He subsequently attained a law degree from the University of Victoria Faculty of Law, then practised business law in the resource sector, eventually becoming partner at Lawson Lundell LLP.

Lee is married with three young adult children.

Political career
Lee worked as an assistant to former prime minister Kim Campbell during her time as Minister of Justice and Minister of National Defence, and was a youth organizer for the Progressive Conservatives. He also assisted in Tung Chan's successful campaign for Vancouver City Council in the 1990 municipal election.

He joined the British Columbia Liberal Party in 2002, serving as its membership chair at one point. He then ran for the Liberals in the 2017 provincial election, in which he was elected member of the Legislative Assembly (MLA) for Vancouver-Langara for the first time. He was re-elected MLA in the 2020 provincial election. During his time in the legislature, Lee has served as the Official Opposition Critic for Transportation, Infrastructure and TransLink; Official Opposition Critic for Justice; and Official Opposition Co-Critic for Indigenous Relations.

In September 2017, Lee announced he would run for the leadership of the BC Liberals. Despite winning the most votes over the first four rounds, he finished in third place behind winner Andrew Wilkinson and runner-up Dianne Watts.

On June 9, 2021, Lee announced he was running again for the leadership of the BC Liberals. This time he finished third behind winner Kevin Falcon and runner-up Ellis Ross on the fifth ballot.

Other activities
Lee has served as the past chair of the board of directors of Arts Umbrella, and Alumni UBC, the University of British Columbia alumni organization. He has also served as a past vice-chair and board member of Science World British Columbia, S.U.C.C.E.S.S., and Leadership Vancouver. Lee is a past board member of the YMCA of Greater Vancouver Foundation, the Justice Education Society of BC, Sustainable Cities International, and the Downtown Vancouver Business Improvement Association.

Electoral record

References

External links

MLA: Michael Lee – Legislative Assembly of British Columbia biography

21st-century Canadian politicians
British Columbia Liberal Party MLAs
Canadian politicians of Hong Kong descent
Lawyers in British Columbia
Living people
University of British Columbia alumni
University of Victoria alumni
Canadian politicians of Chinese descent
Politicians from Vancouver
Year of birth missing (living people)